Cariboo is an adapted spelling of the word "caribou" (a North America name for reindeer). The term can refer to:

 Cariboo, an intermontane region of British Columbia, Canada
 Cariboo Mountains, the northernmost subrange of the Columbia Mountains
 Cariboo Plateau, a volcanic plateau in southern-central British Columbia
 Cariboo Heart Range, a mountain subrange in northern British Columbia
 Cariboo Regional District
 Cariboo District, a federal electoral district in British Columbia from 1871 to 1872
 Cariboo (electoral district), a federal electoral district in British Columbia from 1914 to 1966
 Cariboo (provincial electoral district), a former provincial electoral district from 1871 to ?
 Cariboo River, British Columbia
 Cariboo Road
 Cariboo, British Columbia, the old name of Lamming Mills, British Columbia
 Cariboo, an official neighbourhood of the city of Coquitlam, British Columbia
 Cariboo, a former name of Caribou, California, United States, a census-designated place
 Cariboo (ship, 1902), see Boats of the Mackenzie River watershed

See also
 Cariboo Gold Rush
 Caribou (disambiguation)